Derbyshire Dales District Council elections are held every four years. Derbyshire Dales District Council is the local authority for the non-metropolitan district of Derbyshire Dales in Derbyshire, England. Before 1987, the district was called West Derbyshire. Since the last boundary changes in 2003, 39 councillors have been elected from 25 wards. New ward boundaries are due to come into effect from the 2023 elections.

Political control
The first election to the council was held in 1973, initially operating as a shadow authority before coming into its powers on 1 April 1974. Since 1973 political control of the council has been held by the following parties:

Leadership
The leaders of the council since 1995 have been:

Council elections
Below is a summary of the council election results since 1991.

District result maps

By-election results
By-elections occur when seats become vacant between council elections. Below is an incomplete summary of recent by-elections.

References

External links
Derbyshire Dales Council